Labeotropheus is a genus of fish in the family Cichlidae endemic to Lake Malawi in eastern Africa. It includes at least 4 species, each with a number of subspecies or races. Further taxonomic work is required to determine how many species exist. These cichlids are popular ornamental fish and are ideally suited to the cichlid aquarium. Like many Malawi cichlids, these species are algal grazers. Like all cichlids from Lake Malawi these cichlids are best maintained in hard, alkaline water. This genus are best kept in aquariums with volumes greater than 120 L (31.5 gallon). The aquarium should be decorated with rocks, although caves can also be easily created from terracotta pots.

Species
There are currently 5 recognized species in this genus:
 Labeotropheus artatorostris Pauers 2017
 Labeotropheus chlorosiglos Pauers, 2016 
 Labeotropheus fuelleborni C. G. E. Ahl, 1926 
 Labeotropheus simoneae Pauers, 2016 
 Labeotropheus trewavasae Fryer, 1956

References

 

Fishkeeping
Cichlid genera
Taxa named by Ernst Ahl